West Branch Narraguagus River may refer to:

West Branch Narraguagus River (Cherryfield, Maine)
West Branch Narraguagus River (Hancock County, Maine)